The 1951–52 Israel State Cup (Gvia HaMedina) was the 16th season of Israel's nationwide football cup competition and the first after the Israeli Declaration of Independence.

The final was held at the Basa Stadium on 7 June 1952, between Maccabi Tel Aviv and Maccabi Petah Tikva, and latter won 1–0 to win its second cup.

Results

First round
14 of the 15 Liga Gimel (3rd tier) clubs which had registered to play in the cup competed in the first round (the 15th, Hapoel Beit Oren received a bye to the second round). Matches were held on 24 November 1951.

Bye: Hapoel Beit Oren

Second round
All 28 Liga Bet (2nd tier) clubs joined the 8 Liga Gimel club, qualified from the first round. Matches were played on 8 December 1951. The replays were played on 5 January 1952, after a few Saturdays of torrential rain, which prevented any football activity.

Replays

Third round
The 18 qualified teams were joined by the 12 Liga Alef clubs. Most matches were held on  26 January 1952, with three, of Maccabi Tel Aviv, Hapoel Tel Aviv and Maccabi Petah Tikva postponed to 16 February 1952, since players of these clubs were with an IDF XI team on a tour in Cyprus.

Fourth round
The 15 qualifiers from the third round were divided into 7 ties, with Maccabi Rishon LeZion receiving a bye to the quarter-finals.
Matches were played on 23 February 1952, with the tie between Hapoel Haifa and Hapoel Tel Aviv going into a double replay, played on 1 March 1952 and 8 March 1952. 
The second replay between the teams were abandoned midway through the second half, with Hapoel Tel Aviv leading 2–0, after a Hapoel player was sent off, and the crowd stormed the pitch. The IFA ordered the teams to play the 23 minutes left in the game on a neutral pitch. Hapoel Haifa appealed the decision, and when the appeal was denied, resigned from the competition.

Bye: Maccabi Rishon LeZion

Replay

Second Replay

Quarter-finals
Matches were played on 8 March 1952, except for the tie between Hapoel Tel Aviv and Hapoel Ramat Gan, which was delayed until the fourth round tie between Hapoel Tel Aviv and Hapoel Haifa was resolved, and played on 12 April 1952.

Semi-finals
The first semi-final, between Hapoel Petah Tikva and Maccabi Tel Aviv was played on 22 March 1952. The second was delayed for over two months and was finally played on 24 May 1952.

Final

Notes

References
100 Years of Football 1906-2006, Elisha Shohat (Israel), 2006

External links
 Israel Football Association website

Israel State Cup
State Cup
Israel State Cup seasons